The Butt Road Jama Masjid is a mosque located in St Thomas Mount on the outskirts of Chennai, India. Situated at a distance of 13 kilometres from Chennai city and 2 kilometres from Guindy on the Mount-Poonamallee Road, the mosque caters to the Muslim population of the suburb and the nearby cantonment.

History 

The Jama Masjid was constructed on 11 November 1889 by a Muslim community leader Janab Shaikh Dawood and his brothers. The mosque became property of the Wakf board in 1905. The old mosque was demolished and a new mosque built in its place in 1984. The Masjid underwent an expansion plan and a new look was given to the masjid as well as more place was created to afford over crowd during Eid times and Friday Jumma. 
Many people working in nearby IT Parks and IT companies flew to Butt Road Masjid to offer prayers along with local Muhalla people. The Imam of the Masjid delivers a mind touching speech in his bions.

One of the few masjids that allows Muslim women to attend "Eid Namazs" inside the Masjid. But they are offered separate place to offer Namaz and hear bions. Apart from Masjid activities they offer "Dawah Programs for non muslims", Nikah Arrangements, their own kabarastan to leading janaza namaz.
The Imam of the masjid "Moulana Moulavi Muhammed Zakaria Kasibi" heads the "Shariath Board of the masjid and takes care of the madarasa preachings to people."

References 

 

Mosques in Tamil Nadu
Mosques completed in 1889
Buildings and structures in Kanchipuram district